Acianthera papillosa  is a species of orchid.

papillosa
Plants described in 1835